The Barasway Formation is a volcanic formation cropping out in Newfoundland.

References

Neoproterozoic Newfoundland and Labrador
Geology of Newfoundland and Labrador